The 1939 Boston Bees season was the 69th season of the franchise.

Offseason 
 December 16, 1938: Ray Mueller was traded by the Bees to the Pittsburgh Pirates for Johnny Dickshot, Al Todd and cash.
 December 29, 1938: Al Simmons was purchased by the Bees from the Washington Senators for $3,000.

Regular season

Season standings

Record vs. opponents

Notable transactions 
 April 10, 1939: Johnny Dickshot was purchased from the Bees by the New York Giants.
 April 24, 1939: Oliver Hill was purchased from the Bees by the Milwaukee Brewers.
 August 19, 1939: Milt Shoffner was selected off waivers from the Bees by the Cincinnati Reds
 August 31, 1939: Al Simmons was purchased from the Bees by the Cincinnati Reds.

Roster

Player stats

Batting

Starters by position 
Note: Pos = Position; G = Games played; AB = At bats; H = Hits; Avg. = Batting average; HR = Home runs; RBI = Runs batted in

Other batters 
Note: G = Games played; AB = At bats; H = Hits; Avg. = Batting average; HR = Home runs; RBI = Runs batted in

Pitching

Starting pitchers 
Note: G = Games pitched; IP = Innings pitched; W = Wins; L = Losses; ERA = Earned run average; SO = Strikeouts

Other pitchers 
Note: G = Games pitched; IP = Innings pitched; W = Wins; L = Losses; ERA = Earned run average; SO = Strikeouts

Relief pitchers 
Note: G = Games pitched; W = Wins; L = Losses; SV = Saves; ERA = Earned run average; SO = Strikeouts

Farm system 

LEAGUE CHAMPIONS: Allentown

Notes

References 
1939 Boston Bees season at Baseball Reference

Boston Bees seasons
Boston Bees
Boston Bees
1930s in Boston